David Thompson McCartney (26 December 1875 – 8 December 1949) was a Scottish professional footballer, best remembered for his time as a centre half in the Southern League with Northampton Town and Watford. He also played in the Football League for Glossop and Chelsea.

Career statistics

Honours 
Northampton Town
Southern League First Division: 1908–09
Watford
 Southern League Second Division: 1903–04

References

1875 births
1949 deaths
Footballers from East Ayrshire
Scottish footballers
Association football wing halves
English Football League players
Lugar Boswell Thistle F.C. players
Glossop North End A.F.C. players
Watford F.C. players
Chelsea F.C. players
Southern Football League players
Northampton Town F.C. players
Scottish people of Irish descent
Scottish emigrants to Australia